Barbara Robertson is an American actress and singer. She plays the role of "Jan the Unnamed" for the American Theatre Company's Pre-Broadway Chicago production of "Yeast Nation". Recently she played the role of Mame at the Drury Lane Theatre.

She may be most well known for playing Madame Morrible in the Chicago production of Wicked. She first played the role from May 8, 2007, through June 25, 2008, and again to close out the production from November 18, 2008, until the final performance on January 25, 2009. She also played a limited engagement with the touring production of the show on its stop in Chicago, which ran from December 1, 2010, through January 23, 2011.

She has also performed in Angels of America: Part I & II, Hamlet, A Little Night Music, Who's Afraid of Virginia Woolf?, Mary Stuart, La Bete, Grand Hotel, The Goat, or Who Is Sylvia?, Garden, Pal Joey, Black Snow, Kabuki Medea, and Emma's Child. She has also appeared in many film and TV productions, including The Company, The Straight Story, Will of Their Own, Disney's Mother's Courage, Paramount's The Untouchables, and Early Edition.

She is a 1972 graduate of Glenbard West High School in Glen Ellyn, Illinois.

Filmography

Film

Television

Short films

References

Living people
American musical theatre actresses
1968 births
21st-century American women